Ann Flood is an American politician. She is a Republican member of the Pennsylvania House of Representatives, representing the 138th district in Northampton County since 2021.

Biography
Flood graduated from Pen Argyl High School and received a BS in biology from Moravian College.

In 2020, Flood was elected to the Pennsylvania House of Representatives representing the 138th district, which is part of Northampton County. She defeated Democratic candidate Tara Zrinski with 56.2% of the vote in the general election.

Flood currently sits on the Aging & Older Adult Services, Children & Youth, Game & Fisheries, and Human Services committees.

References

External links
Pennsylvania House of Representatives profile

Living people
Republican Party members of the Pennsylvania House of Representatives
21st-century American women politicians
Women in Pennsylvania politics
Women state legislators in Pennsylvania
21st-century American politicians
Year of birth missing (living people)